George Merrick (born 4 October 1992) is a professional rugby union player, currently playing for Carcassonne in the French Pro D2 competition. 

Merrick made his senior debut for Harlequins against Wasps during the 2013 London Double Header held at Twickenham Stadium.

He was part of the England U20s squad that won the 2012 Six Nations Under 20s Championship. He then travelled to South Africa that same year for the 2012 IRB Junior World Championship.

On 4 January 2019, Merrick signed a two-year contract for Clermont lasting until 2021. However, after a season spent in France, Merrick chose to return to England to sign for Worcester Warriors back in the Premiership Rugby ahead of the 2020–21 season.

ON 1 December 2022, Merrick left Newcastle with immediate effect to return to France to join Carcassonne in the second-tier Pro D2 competition during the 2022-23 season.

References

External links

1992 births
Living people
ASM Clermont Auvergne players
English expatriates in France
English rugby union players
Expatriate rugby union players in France
Harlequin F.C. players
People educated at Whitgift School
Rugby union players from Carshalton
Rugby union locks